There have been two baronetcies created for members of the Fry family, both in the Baronetage of the United Kingdom. Both creations are extinct.

The Fry Baronetcy, of Woodburn in the parish of Blackwell in the County of Durham, was created in the Baronetage of the United Kingdom on 6 February 1894 for the businessman and Liberal politician Theodore Fry. He was a member of the Fry family of Bristol. The title became extinct on the death of the fifth Baronet in 1987.

The Fry Baronetcy, of Oare in the County of Wiltshire, was created in the Baronetage of the United Kingdom on 29 July 1929 for Geoffrey Fry, private secretary to Prime Minister Stanley Baldwin. He was also a member of the Fry family of Bristol and a kinsman of the first Baronet of Woodburn. The title became extinct on his death in 1960. His only child Jennifer Fry was the wife of the poet Alan Ross.

Fry baronets, of Woodburn (1894)
Sir Theodore Fry, 1st Baronet (1836–1912)
Sir John Pease Fry, 2nd Baronet (1864–1957)
Sir Theodore Penrose Fry, 3rd Baronet (1892–1971)
Sir John Nicholas Pease Fry, 4th Baronet (1897–1985)
Sir Francis Wilfrid Fry, 5th Baronet (1904–1987)

Fry baronets, of Oare (1929)
Sir Geoffrey Storrs Fry, 1st Baronet (1888–1960)

References

External links
Daily Telegraph obituary of Jennifer Ross

Extinct baronetcies in the Baronetage of the United Kingdom